118 Modules is an outdoor 1979 sculpture by American artist John Rogers, located at the parking garage at Southwest Yamhill Street between Southwest 9th and 10th Avenues in downtown Portland, Oregon.

The slip-cast white stoneware sculpture measures  x  x . It was funded by the Comprehensive Employment and Training Act (CETA) and marks the artist's first public art commission. Rogers is a Portland native and graduate of Portland State University. 118 Modules is part of the City of Portland and Multnomah County Public Art Collection courtesy of the Regional Arts & Culture Council.

See also

 1979 in art

References

External links
 118 Modules at the Public Art Archive
 Portland Cultural Tours: Public Art Walking Tour (PDF), Regional Arts & Culture Council

1979 establishments in Oregon
1979 sculptures
Ceramic sculptures in the United States
Outdoor sculptures in Portland, Oregon
Sculptures by American artists
Southwest Portland, Oregon